Roman M. McDougald (1907 – June 3, 1960) was an American mystery writer.

Biography
He was born in 1907 in Concordia Parish, Louisiana to Grace M. Wallace E. McDougald. He enlisted in the US Army on November 10, 1942. He died on June 3, 1960.

Writings
The Deaths of Lora Karen (1944)
The Whistling Legs (1945)
Purgatory Street (1946)
Lady Without Mercy (1948)
The Woman Under the Mountain (1950)
The Blushing Monkey (1953)

1907 births
1960 deaths
American mystery writers
20th-century American novelists
American male novelists
People from Concordia Parish, Louisiana
20th-century American male writers